Quellorjo (possibly from Quechua q'illu yellow, urqu mountain, "yellow mountain") is a mountain in the Urubamba mountain range in the Andes of Peru, about  high. It is located in the Cusco Region, Urubamba Province, Ollantaytambo District, northwest of Ollantaytambo. It lies southwest of Yurac Orjo ("white mountain").

References

Mountains of Peru
Mountains of Cusco Region